The 1974 Segunda División de Chile was the 23rd season of the Segunda División de Chile.

Santiago Morning was the tournament's champion.

First phase

Group North

Group South

Second phase

Championship playoffs

See also
Chilean football league system

References

External links
 RSSSF 1974

Segunda División de Chile (1952–1995) seasons
Primera B
Chil